Zombie Nation is the project of German DJ and producer Florian Senfter. Zombie Nation's single "Kernkraft 400" was a worldwide hit.

History
The first Zombie Nation EP was released in the spring of 1999 on DJ Hell's label, International DeeJay Gigolo Records. A remix of the song "Kernkraft 400" on this debut release reached high chart positions all over the world, including number 2 in the United Kingdom.

Since 2001, Florian Senfter has released tracks on different labels under Zombie Nation and his other pseudonym John Starlight.   In 2002 he did not renew his contract with International DeeJay Gigolo Records and started his own label, Dekathlon Records, where he released his second album "Absorber" in 2003.  In early 2005, the new sublabel UKW Records was launched with John Starlight's John's Addiction Part 1 followed by Paeng Paeng 12" by Zombie Nation which was recorded a few months later. Sven Väth realized the potential of the song at first glance and licensed it for his Cocoon Recordings imprint.

The third album Black Toys which was released in 2006 on UKW Records Zombie Nation is a bass dominated soundscape  from tech-hop to funk-laden house. In 2007, Zombie Nation collaborated with Tiga under the pseudonym ZZT on the recording "Lower State of Consciousness".

Zombie Nation is also known today as an electronic music live act. Unusually for a DJ, he uses musical hardware on stage to create sounds. The main instrument is an Akai MPC 4000 Music sequencer which he uses in combination with a mixing console and several effects units to do a live arrangement and Mix of his music.

In December 2009 and January 2010, Zombie Nation created an orchestrated track, and Florian tells the story like so: 

The result was a track by "Zombie Nation and Friends" titled "The Mind of Many".

Discography

Albums
1999 – Leichenschmaus (Gigolo 028)
2003 – Absorber (Dekathlon 010)
2006 – Black Toys (UKW 5)
2009 – Zombielicious (UKW 12)
2011 – Partys Over Earth as ZZT with Tiga (Turbo 033)
2012 – RGB (Turbo 036)

Singles/EPs
1999 – "Kernkraft 400"
2001 – Kernkraft 400 (Gigolo 019)
2001 – Unload (Gigolo 082)
2003 – Souls at Zero, 12" (+ Sven Väth Remix) (Dekathlon 009)
2003 – The Cut, 12" + DJ Naughty Remix (Dekathlon 012)
2005 – Paeng Paeng, 12" (UKW-2 // ltd. 500)
2005 – Paeng Paeng +  Meatmaster Jack, 12" (Cocoon Records 17)
2006 – Money Talks, 12" (UKW 3)
2007 – Gizmode, 12" (UKW 8)
2007 – Lower State of Consciousness, 12" (UKW/Turbo) as ZZT with Tiga including Justice Remix.
2008 – The Worm, 12" (UKW/Turbo)  as ZZT with Tiga including Erol Alkan Remix.
2008 – Forza, 12", remixes by Fukkk Offf and Housemeister (UKW 10)
2009 – Worth It, 12" (UKW 11)
2010 – Overshoot / Squeek, 12", remixes by  DJ Mehdi and Bart B More (UKW 13)
2010 – ZZafrika  as ZZT with Tiga
2011 – Chickflick, 12", remixes by Boris Dlugosch and Siriusmo (UKW 14)
2011 – Vulkan Alarm!, 12",  as ZZT with Tiga (Turbo 109)
2011 – Tight single, with a remix by Étienne de Crécy
2011 – Partys over Los Angeles, as ZZT with Tiga
2012 – Meathead  EP (Turbo 133)
2013 – Fishtank/ Guzzler (UKW 017)
2014 – Gnork (UKW 019)
2014 – TGV (UKW 019)
2015 – A Night At The Zoo (UKW 021)
2016 – Something Else (Twin Turbo 036)
2017 – Knockout (UKW 022)
2017 – Worldwise (UKW 023)
2018 – Ticket (GPM442)

Remixes
1999 Dakkar & Grinser – "Take me naked" (DiskoB 087)
1999 Philip Boa and the Voodoclub – "So What" (BMG Ariola)
1999 Sexual Harassment – "I Need a Freak" (Lasergun Rec.Lasergun 003)
1999 Frankie Bones – "My house is your house" (Bash Rec.  bash 004)
2001 Takkyū Ishino – "Suck me Disko" (Zomba Rec. EXEC 08)
2001 I-F – "Space Invaders are smoking grass" (Loaded/Eastwest Leaded 012)
2001 Ladytron – "Playgirl" (Labels/Virgin  LC03098)
2002 Colonel Abrams;– "Trapped" (eastwest UPUS011.03)
2002 Divine;– "Native Love" (Gigolo/EDM 090)
2002 AFA / Human League – "Being Boiled" (Edel 0141690CLU)
2002 My Robot Friend – "The Fake" (Dekathlon 002)
2002 Gater – "Taboo" (Dekathlon 003)
2002 Acid Scout – "Sexy Robot" (Kurbel 027)
2003 My Robot Friend – "Walt Whitman" (Dekathlon 008)
2004 NAM:LIVE – "The Church of NAM" (Dekathlon 013)
2004 Codec & Flexor – "Time has changed" (Television 08)
2007 Headman – "On" (Relish)
2008 The Presets – "This Boy´s in Love" Modular
2008 Three 6 Mafia – "I Got"
2009 Adam Freeland – "Under Control" (Marine Parade)
2009 Kid Sister – "Get Fresh" (Fools Gold)
2009 Tiga – "What You Need" (Turbo Records)
2012 Housemeister – Clarisse (Boysnoize BNR077D)
2017 DJ Pierre – Strobe Light Laser Acid (Get Physical)

Singles

References

External links
 Official website

German dance music groups
German electronic music groups
Musical groups established in 1999
1999 establishments in Germany
Club DJs
Remixers